Swerve may refer to:

 Turning an automobile sharply to avoid a road hazard

 Clinamen, a concept in early atomic theory
 The curved flight of a spinning object due to the Magnus effect
 A brand of Erythritol-based sugar substitute

Sport
 Isaiah "Swerve" Scott, American professional wrestler
 Swerve (professional wrestling), a sudden change in the direction of a "storyline"

Music
 Swerve (album), by Giant Sand
 "Swerve" (Starrah and Diplo song), 2017
 "Swerve" (Jay1 song), 2021
 "Swerve City", a 2012 song by Deftones
 "Swerve", a 2021 song by Papa Roach from Ego Trip

Literature
 Swerve (magazine), a Canadian magazine for LGBT readers
 The Swerve, a 2011 nonfiction book by Stephen Greenblatt
 Swerve (novel), by Phillip Gwynne
 Swerve, a digital imprint of St. Martin's Press

Other uses
 Swerve (film), a 2011 film
 Swerve (drink), a dairy drink produced by the Coca-Cola Company
 Swerve (Transformers), a character from the Transformers toyline

See also
 
 
 Swervin (disambiguation)
 Swivel
 Swerved